Qarqin is a small boundary district in the northern part of Jowzjan province, Afghanistan. It borders Turkmenistan to the north along the Amu Darya River, Khamyab District to the west, Mingajik and Mardyan districts to the south, and Balkh province to the east. The population is 47,000 (2021). The district center is the town of Qarqin, which is situated on the bank of the Amu Darya River.

See also 
 Districts of Afghanistan
 Qarqin

District Map 
 AIMS District Map

Districts of Jowzjan Province